Westvale is a locality in the Somerset Region, Queensland, Australia.

Geography 
The locality is bounded on the west by Lake Somerset, the impoundment created on the Stanley River by the Somerset Dam. The creeks in the locality all contribute to the Stanley River.

Some of the southern part of the locality is within the D'Aguilar National Park (which extends into neighbouring Mount Archer and Mount Bryon.

Apart from the national park, the predominant land use is grazing on native vegetation.

History 
Villeneuve Provisional School opened on 30 May 1887. About 1894 the school was physically relocated to Westvale. In 1902 it was renamed West Vale Provisional School. Due to low student numbers it closed in September 1907 but reopened in July 1908. It closed permanently in 1910.

Education 
There are no schools in the locality. The nearest primary schools are in Kilcoy and Mount Mee. The nearest secondary schools is in Kilcoy and Toogoolawah.

References

Further reading 

 

Suburbs of Somerset Region
Localities in Queensland